Mount Abundance may refer to:
 Mount Abundance, Queensland, Maranoa Region, Australia
 Mount Abundance Homestead, Bungil, Maranoa Region, Queensland, Australia